Marilyn McCord Adams (October 12, 1943–March 22, 2017) was an American philosopher and Episcopal priest. She specialized in the philosophy of religion, philosophical theology, and medieval philosophy. She was Horace Tracy Pitkin Professor of Historical Theology at Yale Divinity School from 1998 to 2003 and Regius Professor of Divinity at the University of Oxford from 2004 to 2009.

Early life and education 
Adams was born on October 12, 1943, in Oak Park, Illinois, United States. She was the daughter of William Clark McCord and Wilmah Brown McCord. In 1966, she married the philosopher Robert Merrihew Adams.

Adams was educated at the University of Illinois at Urbana–Champaign, graduating with a Bachelor of Arts (AB) degree. She continued her studies at Cornell University, completing her Doctor of Philosophy (PhD) degree in 1967. She undertook studies and training for ordained ministry at Princeton Theological Seminary, graduating with a Master of Theology degree in 1984. She was awarded a Doctor of Divinity (DD) by the University of Oxford in 2008, thereby becoming the first woman to become an Oxford DD.

Career

Academic career 
Adams spent the majority of her academic career at the University of California, Los Angeles: she was an associate professor (1972–1978) and then professor of philosophy from 1978 to 1993, and chair of the Department of Philosophy between 1985 and 1987. She was President of the Society for Medieval and Renaissance Philosophy from 1980 to 1982. Having moved to Yale University, she was professor of historical theology from 1993 to 2003 and the Horace Tracy Pitkin Professor of Historical Theology at Yale Divinity School from 1998 to 2003.

In 2004, Adams moved to England where she had been appointed Regius Professor of Divinity at the University of Oxford. The chair is linked to a canonry at Christ Church Cathedral, Oxford, and so she also became a residentiary canon. She was the first woman and the first American to be appointed the Regius Professor of Divinity at Oxford. In 2009, after five years abroad, she returned to the United States to join the University of North Carolina at Chapel Hill as a distinguished research professor of philosophy. She moved to Rutgers University, where she was a visiting/distinguished research professor from 2013 to 2015.

Adams was elected a Fellow of the American Academy of Arts and Sciences in 2015.

Adams was a cofounder and president of the Society of Christian Philosophers.

Ordained ministry 
Adams was ordained as a deacon and priest in the Episcopal Church (United States) in 1987. She served at parish churches in Los Angeles, New Haven, Connecticut, Chapel Hill, North Carolina, and Trenton, New Jersey. From 2004 to 2009, she served as a residentiary canon of Christ Church Cathedral, Oxford. During that time, she was elected as a university representative to the General Synod of the Church of England.

Work and writing 

Adams' work in philosophy focused on the philosophy of religion, especially the problem of evil, philosophical theology, metaphysics, and medieval philosophy. Her work on the problem of evil largely focused on what she calls "horrendous evils". She was an avowed Christian universalist, believing that ultimately all will receive salvation and restoration in Christ:Traditional doctrines of hell err again by supposing either that God does not get what God wants with every human being ("God wills all humans to be saved" by God's antecedent will) or that God deliberately creates some for ruin. To be sure, many human beings have conducted their ante-mortem lives in such a way as to become anti-social persons. Almost none of us dies with all the virtues needed to be fit for heaven. Traditional doctrines of hell suppose that God lacks the will or the patience or the resourcefulness to civilize each and all of us, to rear each and all of us up into the household of God. They conclude that God is left with the option of merely human penal systems – viz., liquidation or quarantine!

Personal life 
In 1966, Marilyn McCord married Robert Merrihew Adams.

Adams died on March 22, 2017, in Princeton, New Jersey, aged 73; she had had cancer.

Works 
 Adams, Marilyn McCord. "Is the Existence of God a 'Hard' Fact?". The Philosophical Review Vol. LXXVI, No. 4 (October 1967) 492-503.
 Adams, Marilyn McCord, trans. Paul of Venice, On the Truth and Falsity of Propositions and On the Significatum of a Proposition, ed. Francesco del Punta. London: Oxford University Press for the British Academy, 1977.
 Adams, Marilyn McCord and Norman Kretzman, eds. and trans. William Ockham's Predestination, God's Foreknowledge, and Future Contingents. 2nd ed. Indianapolis, Indiana: Hackett, 1983.
 Adams, Marilyn McCord. William of Ockham (2 vols.) Notre Dame, Indiana: Notre Dame University Press, 1987. 
 Adams, Marilyn McCord, and Robert Merrihew Adams, eds. The Problem of Evil. Oxford: Oxford University Press, 1990.
 Adams, Marilyn McCord. Horrendous Evils and the Goodness of God. Ithaca: Cornell University Press, 1999. .
 Adams, Marilyn McCord. "What Sort of Human Nature? Medieval Philosophy and the Systematics of Christology" (Aquinas Lecture 1999). Milwaukee: Marquette University Press, 1999.
 Adams, Marilyn McCord. Christ and Horrors: The Coherence of Christology. Based on the Gifford Lectures for 1998–1999. Cambridge: Cambridge University Press, 2006. 
 Adams, Marilyn McCord.  Some Later Medieval Theories of the Eucharist: Thomas Aquinas, Giles of Rome, Duns Scotus, and William Ockham.  New York: Oxford University Press, 2010.

See also 
 Faculty of Theology and Religion, University of Oxford
 List of American philosophers
 Theodicy

References

External links 
 McCord Adams' faculty page at Oxford University
 Sermon on issues in human sexuality (2004)
 Episode of In Our Time (May 2007), "Ockham's Razor", BBC Radio 4.
 Interview with Philosophy Bites on evil and optimism
 On Adams' "aesthetic" theodicy.

1943 births
2017 deaths
20th-century American Episcopal priests
20th-century American philosophers
20th-century Christian universalists
21st-century American Episcopal priests
21st-century American philosophers
21st-century Christian universalists
American Christian universalists
American Episcopal theologians
American women philosophers
Analytic philosophers
Anglican philosophers
Anglican universalists
Christian philosophers
Christian universalist clergy
Christian universalist theologians
Cornell University alumni
Deaths from cancer in New Jersey
Women Anglican clergy
Philosophers of religion
Presidents of the Society for Medieval and Renaissance Philosophy
Presidents of the Society of Christian Philosophers
Princeton Theological Seminary alumni
Regius Professors of Divinity (University of Oxford)
Scholars of medieval philosophy
University of California, Los Angeles faculty
University of Illinois Urbana-Champaign alumni
University of North Carolina at Chapel Hill faculty
Yale University faculty
20th-century American women writers
21st-century American women writers